John Clark (c. 1825–1904) was a State Senator from Windom, Minnesota.  He served in the Minnesota State Senate  from 1887 to 1890 in the 8th district serving Watonwan and Cottonwood counties.  He was preceded in his position by George Knudson and succeeded by Eric Sevatson.  He also served in the Massachusetts General Court in 1864.  He was born in Unity, New Hampshire in 1825.  He received an elementary education.  In addition to his work in the state legislature, he served on the Cottonwood County Board of Commissioners and as President of the Village Board in Windom.  He died in 1904.

Notes

References 

1825 births
1904 deaths
Minnesota state senators
People from Windom, Minnesota
People from Unity, New Hampshire
19th-century American politicians